Anson Herrick (January 21, 1812 – February 6, 1868) was a U.S. Representative from New York during the latter half of the American Civil War. A newspaperman by trade, he served a single term in Congress from 1863 to 1865.

Biography
Born in Lewiston, Maine, Herrick attended public school. He was a son of Ebenezer Herrick.

Newspaperman 
Later on, Herrick learned the art of printing. Herrick established The Citizen at Wiscasset, Maine, in 1833, and moved to New York City in 1836. Herrick established the New York Atlas in 1838, which he continued until his death in 1868. In 1841, he founded a two-penny daily newspaper with John F. Ropes titled The New York Aurora, which was later edited for a time by Walt Whitman.

Political career 
Herrick served as a member of the New York city board of aldermen from Ward 19 during 1853–1857. 
Herrick was appointed by President James Buchanan as naval storekeeper for the port of New York, serving from 1857 to 1861.

Congress 
Herrick was elected as a Democrat to the Thirty-eighth Congress (March 4, 1863 – March 3, 1865). Herrick was one of the few Democrats to vote for the submission of the 13th Amendment to the states.  (Herrick had previously published editorials in favor of the amendment, but apparently voted for it in exchange for President Lincoln appointing his brother as a federal revenue assessor. After Lincoln's death the appointment was never confirmed.)

Herrick was an unsuccessful candidate for reelection in 1864 to the Thirty-ninth Congress.

Later career and death 
He subsequently resumed his journalistic pursuits. He served as a delegate to the Union National Convention at Philadelphia in 1866. Herrick died in New York City February 6, 1868, and was interred in Green-Wood Cemetery, Brooklyn, New York.

References

External links
 Retrieved on 2009-03-23

1812 births
1868 deaths
American newspaper publishers (people)
People of New York (state) in the American Civil War
Burials at Green-Wood Cemetery
American newspaper founders
19th-century American newspaper publishers (people)
Democratic Party members of the United States House of Representatives from New York (state)
19th-century American journalists
American male journalists
19th-century American male writers
19th-century American politicians